It is located in Multan on Muzaffar Garh Road where N70 meets with Sher Shah Road. Two railway tracks also join here. 
A flyover passing over the one main railway track was constructed on N70. The Sher Shah road  passes beneath the flyover and joins the N70, while another slip from Sher Shah Road joins the N70 after crossing the second railway track. Main road N70 crosses the second railway track with a second flyover.

See also
 Chowk Kumharanwala Level II Flyover
 List of flyovers in Multan
 List of flyovers in Pakistan
 List of flyovers in Lahore

References

External links
 Multan City government website
 Portal of Multan City

Buildings and structures in Multan